The 12 megawatt (MW) Wyandot Solar Facility is a solar photovoltaic power plant completed in 2010, located in Salem Township, Wyandot County, Ohio.

Juwi Solar developed the Wyandot Solar Facility and Vaughn Industries, based in Wyandot County, was the primary construction contractor. Most of the construction jobs created by the project went to Ohio residents. First Solar supplied the solar panels from their manufacturing plant in Perrysburg, Ohio.

On August 24, 2010, Ohio Governor Ted Strickland joined The Public Service Enterprise Group, Ohio State University President Dr. E. Gordon Gee, and other local leaders to open the solar facility.

Production

See also

Energy sector of Ohio
List of photovoltaic power stations
Renewable energy in the United States
Renewable portfolio standard
Solar power in the United States

References

Energy infrastructure completed in 2010
Power stations in Ohio
Buildings and structures in Wyandot County, Ohio
Photovoltaic power stations in the United States